Ingrid Sofia Nilsson (born 3 March 1982) is a Swedish Centre Party politician who has been a Member of the Riksdag for Skåne County North and East since 2018.

References 

1982 births
Living people
Members of the Riksdag from the Centre Party (Sweden)
21st-century Swedish women politicians
21st-century Swedish politicians
Women members of the Riksdag
Members of the Riksdag 2018–2022